Pallidohecyra pallida is a species of beetle in the family Cerambycidae, and the only species in the genus Pallidohecyra. It was described by Breuning in 1938.

References

Crossotini
Beetles described in 1938
Monotypic beetle genera